Robert Lachmann (28 November 1892 – 8 May 1939) was a German ethnomusicologist, polyglot (German, English, French, Arabic), orientalist and librarian. He was an expert in the musical traditions of the Middle East, a member of the Berlin School of Comparative Musicology and one of its founding fathers. After having been forced to leave Germany under the Nazis in 1935 because of his Jewish background, he emigrated to Palestine and established a rich archive of ethnomusicological recordings for the Hebrew University of Jerusalem.

Life and contributions to ethnomusicology of the Middle East 
Robert Lachmann was born in Berlin, and had learned French and English as a young man. Having been assigned as interpreter at a German camp for prisoners of war (POW) during World War I, he became interested in the languages, songs and customs of POWs from North Africa and India, and started to learn Arabic, which he later followed up at Berlin university. He also studied comparative musicology with Johannes Wolf, Erich von Hornbostel and Curt Sachs and published his Ph.D. dissertation in 1922, based on urban music in Tunisia. Apart from his study Musik des Orients (Music of the Orient), 1929, that compares musical systems of various “Oriental” traditions from North Africa to the Far East, and a translation of a musical treatise by the ninth-century Arab scholar Al-Kindi in 1931, he edited the "Zeitschrift für vergleichende Musikwissenschaft" (Journal of Comparative Musicology) from 1932-35.

In 1935, he was dismissed from his position as music librarian at the Berlin State Library, because he was Jewish, and emigrated to Jerusalem. On the invitation of Judah L. Magnes, chancellor and later president (1935–1948) of The Hebrew University of Jerusalem, Lachmann established a center for Middle Eastern music and the university's archive for "Oriental music". With the assistance of only one sound technician, he recorded almost 1000 new examples of secular and liturgical music. His sound archive was later incorporated into the National Sound Archives of the National Library of Israel. Lachmann died in Jerusalem at age 46.

Apart from his earlier field studies in Tunisia and Morocco, he participated in the 1932 Cairo Congress of Arab Music and was responsible for recording the performances of the artists and ensembles invited to the conference. His important contribution to the ethnomusicology of North Africa and the Middle East is reflected in a description of his radio programmes, transmitted by the English language programme of the Palestine Broadcasting Service (PBS) in 1936-1937, by British musicologist Ruth F. Davis:

Focusing on sacred and secular musical traditions of different “Oriental” communities living in and around Jerusalem, including Bedouin and Palestinian Arabs, Yemenite, Kurdish and Baghdadi Jews, Copts and Samaritans, Lachmann’s lectures were illustrated by more than thirty musical examples performed live in the studio by local musicians and singers and simultaneously recorded on metal disc. In two lectures (numbers 10 and 11), based on commercial recordings, he contextualized the live performances with wide-ranging surveys of the urban musical traditions of North Africa and the Middle East, extending beyond the Arab world to Turkey, Persia, and Hindustan."

Publications 
 Die Musik in den tunisischen Städten (Music in the cities of Tunisia), 1922, (Ph.D. dissertation)
 Musik des Orients (Music of the Orient), Berlin, 1929
 with Mahmoud el-Hefni, eds., Ja'qūb Ibn Isḥāq al-Kindi: Risāla fī Khubr tā'līf al-alhān: Über die Komposition der Melodien, Veröffentlichungen der Gesellschaft zur Erforschung der Musik des Orients, 1 (Leipzig: Fr. Kistner and C. F. W. Siegel, 1931).
 Editor of the Zeitschrift für vergleichende Musikwissenschaft (Journal of Comparative Musicology), 1933-35 (Gesellschaft zur Erforschung des Musik des Orients - The Society for the Study of Oriental Music,) from 1930-1935
 Jewish Cantillation and Song in the Isle of Djerba. (Archives of Oriental Music) Hebrew University, Jerusalem, 1940

 Further reading 
 Davis, Ruth F. Ethnomusicology and Political Ideology in Mandatory Palestine: Robert Lachmann's "Oriental Music" Projects, in: Music & Politics 4, Number 2 (Summer 2010), p. 1–15. (with audio examples of Lachmann's radio programmes) 
 Davis, Ruth F., ed. (2013). Robert Lachmann's Oriental Music Broadcasts, 1936-1937: A Musical Ethnography of Mandatory Palestine , Middleton, Wisconsin, A-R Editions. (ARSC Awards for Excellence 2014)
 Katz, Israel J. with the collaboration of Sheila M. Craik (2020). Robert Lachmann's Correspondence with Henry George Farmer (from 1923 to 1938). E.J. Brill, Leiden
 Katz, Ruth (2003). The Lachmann Problem'' . The Hebrew University Magnes press, Jerusalem
 Lingas, A. (2018). The Oriental music broadcasts, 1936–1937: a musical ethnography of mandatory Palestine. Ethnomusicology Forum, 27(2), pp. 243–245. doi: 10.1080/17411912.2018.1508359

References 

German ethnomusicologists
Musicologists from Berlin
1892 births
1939 deaths
Jewish emigrants from Nazi Germany to Mandatory Palestine
20th-century German musicologists
Jewish musicologists
Arabic music
Music librarians
Palestine ethnographers